Vega Schools are a chain of co-educational, private K-12 schools in Gurgaon, Haryana state, India. The medium of instruction is in English and the CBSE & CCE (Continuous and Comprehensive Evaluation) core curriculum. Vega is the only North Indian member school of the Global Schools Alliance - an alliance of the 15 most progressive schools around the world, also with ties to candidates of Harvard Graduate School of Education to set up a research program to explore the various aspects.

History
Vega Schools were established in 2016 by Co Founders Dr. Steven Edwards and Sandeep Hooda. The leadership board comprises leading Indian and Global education experts such as David Price, OBE, Andrew Raymer, Padmashri Awardee Gowri Ishwaran and school design expert Lene Jensby Lange. Respected corporate professionals Rajan Hooda (JP Morgan, McKinsey and Citigroup) and Sunil Radhakrishna (DCM Shriram Group) are also members of the leadership board.

Vega Schools (Primary and Middle)

Vega Schools (Senior)

Academic
Academic facilities include scientifically designed open classrooms and laboratories which are equipped with interactive whiteboards, projection screens to integrate Information Communication Technology (ICT) and multi-purpose air conditioned indoor sports hall and outdoor sports infrastructure for badminton, basketball, cricket, football, tennis, skating, gymnastics, aerobics and yoga.
Vega Schools use PBL - Problem Based Learning, to empower their learners with life skills that will stay relevant, whatever the future may hold. PBL is a 3 in 1 learning method that comprises experiential learning, inquiry based learning and project based learning. PBL is considered to create more learning opportunities at the same time by putting less pressure on children, especially when they are in primary and middle schools. 

The vision is to reimagine education and to create best schools that will serve as ‘agents of change’, where learning is an engaged, innovative and collaborative process, built on a deep value-based foundation, where the child understands, explores, defines and achieves the greatest potential and becomes not just a successful global citizen for the 21st century but an admirable human being for all ages.

The purpose of Vega Schools is to transform education by creating a happy place for children and equipping them with skills for the new world.

Campus and infrastructure
Vega Schools have two campuses in Gurgaon, in sector 48 and sector 76. Campuses have centralized AC systems with PM10 and PM2.5 air purification system and school environment is air pollution free.

Spatial and neuroscientific research has shown that open classrooms naturally increase attention, focus, and curiosity in the brain, which is why the best companies in the world have made the shift towards open and collaborative workspaces.  

Vega Schools have replaced traditional classrooms with open learning classrooms, small group learning zones, individual quiet zones, large spaces for immersive learning and small hubs for individual assistance. These architectural innovations not only create an optimal learning environment and enable ‘real-life learning’ but also help our learners actively imbibe life skills and facilitates empathy, collaboration, enquiry, confidence, imagination, and creativity. They also help minimise negative behaviour such as bullying and enhance the overall safety.

Events

School has organized several editions of Gurgaon Children's Literature Festival (GCLF) among children and parents. Literature festival had sessions of storytelling and interactive workshops and drew the attention of over 3,000 parents and children. Parents and children also explored a collection of books from national and international publishers. Vega Schools believe in triggering the love of reading in children and also have Gurgaon's first free libraries in both their campuses.

See also
 The Shriram School, Gurgaon
 Shiv Nadar Schools, Gurgaon
 Pathways Schools, Gurgaon

References
 https://uniformapp.in/vega-schools-gurgaon

External links
 Vega Schools's Official Website

Primary schools in India
Schools in Gurgaon
Schools in Haryana
International schools in India
Educational institutions established in 2012
2012 establishments in Haryana